Aegires punctilucens is a species of sea slug. It is a dorid nudibranch, a shell-less marine gastropod mollusc in the family Aegiridae.

Distribution 
This species was described from Brest, Brittany, France. It has been reported from the NE Atlantic from Norway, Great Britain and Ireland from Shetland south to Cornwall and from Northern France, Portugal and Spain to Greece in the Mediterranean Sea. Reports from Japan and Australia are likely to be cryptic species.

Description
The maximum recorded body length is 12 mm.

Feeding habits
Aegires punctilucens feeds on the calcareous sponge Leucosolenia botryoides.

References

External links
 

Aegiridae
Gastropods described in 1837